The Extra-Long Staple Cotton Act of 1983 (P.L. 98-88) eliminated marketing quotas and allotments for extra-long staple cotton and tied its support to upland cotton through a formula that set the nonrecourse loan rate at not less than 150% of the upland cotton loan level.
The act amended the Agricultural Act of 1949 to set forth new Extra-Long Staple cotton program provisions and Agriculture and Food Act of 1981 to add Extra-Long Staple cotton to the $50,000 payment limitation for the payments which a person received under commodity programs. The act was sponsored by Kika de la Garza.

References 

1983 in law
98th United States Congress
United States federal agriculture legislation
Cotton industry in the United States